Ryabokon or Riabokon is a surname. It is related to the surname Ryabokin or Riabokin.

Notable people with the surname include:
 Oleg Riabokon (born 1973), Ukrainian politician and lawyer
 Oleksandr Ryabokon (born 1964), Ukrainian footballer
 Stepan Ryabokon (born 1993), Russian footballer

See also
 

Ukrainian-language surnames